Pleujouse is a village and a former municipality in the district of Porrentruy in the canton of Jura in Switzerland. Since January 1, 2009, it has been part of the new municipality La Baroche.

References

Former municipalities of the canton of Jura